The International University of Andalucía or UNIA is a university in Andalusia, set up in 1994 to complete the region's educational system. It offers postgraduate and specialty courses. It has campuses in four Andalusian provinces: Huelva, Jaén, Málaga, and Seville.

UNIA has campuses in four cities in Andalusia: Baeza, La Rábida, Málaga, and Sevilla. Each campus has its own specific focus and facilities, and all of them offer a range of programs and services to students, researchers, and the wider community.

The university offers postgraduate programs in a wide range of fields, including humanities, social sciences, law, engineering, health sciences, and natural sciences. These programs are designed to meet the needs of both Spanish and international students.

Campuses
UNIA has campuses in four of the provinces of Andalusia:

External links 

 Official web site

Universities in Andalusia
1994 establishments in Spain
Educational institutions established in 1994

Universities and colleges in Spain